Lutetium(III) hydroxide is an inorganic compound with the chemical formula Lu(OH)3.

Production
Reacting lutetium chloride and alkalis will first produce Lu(OH)2Cl, then it will become Lu(OH)2.5Cl0.5. Finally, the reaction will produce Lu(OH)3.

LuCl3+2 NaOH→Lu(OH)2Cl+2 NaCl
Lu(OH)2Cl+0.5 NaOH→Lu(OH)2.5Cl0.5+0.5 NaCl
Lu(OH)2.5Cl0.5+0.5 NaOH→Lu(OH)3+0.5 NaCl

Chemical properties
Lutetium(III) hydroxide can react with acid and form lutetium(III) salts：
 Lu(OH)3 + 3 H+ → Lu3+ + 3 H2O
While heating lutetium(III) hydroxide, it will produce LuO(OH), continued heating could produce Lu2O3.

References

Lutetium compounds
Hydroxides